DVGA may refer to:
 Digital Variable Gain Amplifier
 Double-size VGA display resolution